World War II in the Slovene Lands started in April 1941 and lasted until May 1945. The Slovene Lands were in a unique situation during World War II in Europe. In addition to being trisected, a fate that also befell Greece, Drava Banovina (roughly today's Slovenia) was the only region that experienced a further step — absorption and annexation into neighboring Nazi Germany, Fascist Italy, and Hungary. The Slovene-settled territory was divided largely between Nazi Germany and the Kingdom of Italy, with smaller territories occupied and annexed by Hungary and the Independent State of Croatia.

Occupation, resistance, collaboration, civil war, and post-war killings

On 6 April 1941, Yugoslavia was invaded by the Axis Powers. On that day, part of the Slovene-settled territory was occupied by Nazi Germany. On 11 April 1941, further parts of the territory were occupied by Italy and Hungary. The Germans occupied the Upper Carniola, the Lower Styria, the northwestern part of Prekmurje and the northern part of the Lower Carniola. The Italians occupied the Inner Carniola, the majority of the Lower Carniola and Ljubljana, whereas the Hungarians occupied the major part of Prekmurje, which prior to WW1 belonged to Hungary. Resistance by the Kingdom of Yugoslavia's army was insignificant. In 2005, Slovene authors first published information about six villages in Lower Carniola that were annexed by the Independent State of Croatia, and a Maribor-based historian first published original research about it in 2011, but it remains unclear why the villages from Drava Banovina were occupied contrary to a known German-Croatian treaty.

Under the Nazi occupation

The Germans had a plan of the forced location of the Slovene population in the so called Rann Triangle. The area was the border area towards the Italian occupation zone. The German Gottscheers would have been relocated to that area and would form an ethnic barrier to other Slovene lands. The rest of the Slovene population in Lower Styria  was seen as Wends, which should have been assimilated. Nationalist activists and people who moved from other parts of Yugoslavia after 1919 were expelled to the puppet states of Nedić's Serbia and NDH. Because Hitler opposed having the ethnic German Gottscheers in the Italian occupation zone, they were moved out of it. About 46,000 Slovenes were transported to Saxony in Germany in order to make space for the relocated Gottscheers.

The majority of Slovene victims during the war were from the northern Slovenia, i.e. Lower Styria, Upper Carniola, Central Sava Valley, and Slovenian Carinthia. However, their formal annexation to the "German Reich" was postponed because of the installation of the new "Gauleiter" and "Reichsstatthalter" of Carinthia first, and later the Nazis dropped the plan because of the Slovene Partisans, with which they wanted to deal first. Only Meža valley initially became part of "Reichsgau Carinthia".

Nazi persecution of the Church

The Nazi persecution of the Catholic Church in annexed Slovenia was akin to that which occurred in the annexed regions of Poland. Within six weeks of the Nazi occupation, only 100 of the 831 priests in the Diocese of Maribor and part of the Diocese of Ljubljana remained free. Clergy were persecuted and sent to concentration camps, and religious Orders had their properties seized.

Under Fascist Italy's occupation

Compared to the German policies in the northern Nazi-occupied area of Slovenia and the forced Fascist italianization in the former Austrian Littoral that was annexed after the First World War, the initial Italian policy in the central Slovenia was not as violent. Tens of thousands of Slovenes from German-occupied Lower Styria and Upper Carniola escaped to the Province of Ljubljana until June 1941.

However, after resistance started in Province of Ljubljana, Italian violence against the Slovene civil population easily matched that of the Germans. The province saw the deportation of 25,000 people — which equated to 7.5% of the total population of the province  — in one of the most drastic operations in Europe that filled up many Italian concentration camps, such as Rab concentration camp, in Gonars concentration camp, Monigo (Treviso), Renicci d'Anghiari, Chiesanuova and elsewhere. To suppress the mounting resistance by the Slovene Partisans, Mario Roatta adopted draconian measures of summary executions, hostage-taking, reprisals, internments, and the burning of houses and whole villages. The "3C" pamphlet, tantamount to a declaration of war on civilians, involved him in Italian war crimes. A barbed wire fence - which is now the Trail of Remembrance and Comradeship - was put around Ljubljana in order to prevent communication between the city's underground activists in Ljubljana and the majority of partisans in the surrounding countryside.

Resistance

On 26 April 1941, several groups formed the Liberation Front of the Slovene Nation, which was the leading resistance force during the war. The front was initially a democratic platform. With the Dolomiti Declaration, signed in March 1943, the Communists, however, monopolized it. It emitted its own radio program called Kričač the location of which never became known to occupying forces and they had to confiscate the receivers' antennas from the local population in order to prevent listening to the radio of the Slovene Liberation Front. Its military arm was the Slovene Partisans. The Slovene Partisans retained their specific organizational structure and Slovene language as their commanding language until the last months of World War II, when their language was removed as the commanding language. In March 1945, the Slovene Partisan Units were officially merged with the Yugoslav Army and thus ceased to exist as a separate formation.

At the very beginning Slovene Partisan forces were relatively small, poorly armed and without any infrastructure, but Spanish Civil War veterans amongst them had some experience with guerrilla methods of fighting the enemy.
The partisan activities in the Slovene Lands were initially independent of Tito's Partisans in the south. In autumn 1942, Tito attempted for the first time to control the Slovene resistance movement. The merger of the Slovene Partisans with Tito's forces happened in 1944.

In December 1943, Franja Partisan Hospital was built in difficult and rugged terrain, deep inside German-occupied Europe, only a few hours from Austria and the central parts of the Third Reich. German military activity was frequent in the general region throughout the operation of the hospital. It saw continuous improvements until May 1945.

Civil war and post-war killings
In the summer of 1942, a civil war between Slovenes broke out. The two fighting factions were the Slovenian Partisans and the Italian-sponsored anti-communist militia, nicknamed by communists the "White Guard", later re-organized under Nazi command as the Slovene Home Guard. Small units of Slovenian Chetniks also existed in Lower Carniola and Styria. The Partisans were under the command of the Liberation Front (OF) and Tito's Yugoslav resistance, while the Slovenian Covenant served as the political arm of the anti-Communist militia. The civil war was mostly restricted to the Province of Ljubljana, where more than 80% of the Slovene anti-partisan units were active. Between 1943–1945, smaller anti-Communist militia existed in parts of the Slovenian Littoral and in Upper Carniola, while they were virtually non-existent in the rest of the country. By 1945, the total number of Slovene anti-Communist militiamen reached 17,500.

Immediately after the war, some 12,000 members of the Slovene Home Guard were killed in the Kočevski Rog massacres, while thousands of anti-communist civilians were killed in the first year after the war. These massacres were silenced, and remained a taboo topic until an interview with Edvard Kocbek was published by Boris Pahor in his publication Zaliv, causing the 1975 Zaliv Scandal in Tito's Yugoslavia.

End of war and aftermath

World War II in the Slovene Lands lasted until the middle of May 1945. On 3 May, the National State of Slovenia was proclaimed as part of the Kingdom of Yugoslavia. The liberation of Ljubljana, the capital city of the now independent Slovenia, was announced on 9 May 1945. The last battle was the Battle of Poljana, which took place near Prevalje on 14 and 15 May 1945, a few days after the formal surrender of the Nazi Germany. Hundreds of ethnic Italians from the Julian March were killed by the Yugoslav Army and partisan forces in the Foibe massacres; some 27,000 Istrian Italians fled Slovenian Istria from Communist persecution in the so-called Istrian–Dalmatian exodus. Members of the ethnic German minority either fled or were expelled from Slovenia.

Number of victims
The overall number of World War II casualties in Slovenia is estimated at 97,000. The number includes about 14,000 people who were killed or died for other war-related reasons immediately after the end of the war, and the tiny Jewish community, which was nearly annihilated in the Holocaust. In addition, tens of thousands of Slovenes left their homeland soon after the end of the war. Most of them settled in Argentina, Canada, Australia and in the United States.

The overall number of World War Two casualties in Slovenia is estimated to 89,000, while 14,000 people were killed immediately after the end of the war. The overall number of World War II casualties in Slovenia was thus of around 7.2% of the pre-war population, which is above the Yugoslav average, and among the highest percentages in Europe.

Non-extradition of the Italian war criminals

The documents found in British archives by the British historian Effie Pedaliu and by Italian historian Davide Conti, pointed out that the memory of the existence of the Italian concentration camps and Italian war crimes has been repressed due to the Cold War. Yugoslavia, Greece and Ethiopia requested extradition of 1,200 Italian war criminals who however never saw anything like Nuremberg trial. The extradition never took place because the western allies' governments saw in Pietro Badoglio's government a guarantee of an anti-communist post-war Italy.

See also
 Areas annexed by Nazi Germany
 Foibe massacres
 Gonars concentration camp
 Invasion of Yugoslavia
 Italian war crimes
 Maribor prison massacres
 Province of Ljubljana
 Rab concentration camp
 World War II in Yugoslavia

References

External links

 Video of the contribution by historian Damijan Guštin, delivered at the Repression during World War II and in the post-war period in Slovenia and in the neighbouring countries international conference, held at the Institute of Contemporary History, Ljubljana, 2012.

 
Yugoslavia in World War II
World War II